Sandy + Chef is a Brazilian streaming television cooking show hosted by Sandy Leah based on the American television show Selena + Chef. The show premiered on HBO Max on November 11, 2021. The first season consists of 6 episodes.

Premise 
Sandy stars in an unscripted cooking series filmed in her home during quarantine. Each episode features Sandy tackling a new cuisine and guest stars a different professional chef, where they cover tips and tricks and how to deal with disasters in the kitchen. For each episode, the show donates R$25,000 to the charity of the Chef's choice, often food related.

Cast 
Sandy Leah stars as the host of the series. Confirmed guests for the first season include:

 Paola Carosella
 Murakami
 Lili Almeida
 Thiago Castanho
 Renata Vanzetto
 João Diamante

References

2020s Brazilian television series
2021 Brazilian television series debuts
Brazilian cooking television series
Brazilian television series based on American television series
Portuguese-language television shows
HBO Max original programming